Fool's Gold is a 2008 American romantic  action comedy film from Warner Bros. Pictures about a recently divorced couple who rekindle their romantic life while searching for a lost treasure. The film is directed by Andy Tennant and reunites the How to Lose a Guy in 10 Days stars Matthew McConaughey and Kate Hudson. It received negative reviews from critics and grossed $111 million worldwide.

Plot
Ben "Finn" Finnegan is a treasure hunter and he has been searching for the sunken Spanish galleon, the Aurelia, that was lost at sea with the 1715 Treasure Fleet for over eight years. He and his right-hand man Ukrainian Alfonz find a fragment of dishware especially produced as part of the Queen's Dowry when his accidentally sunken ship uncovers it in the seabed.

Owing Gangster rapper Bigg Bunny over $60,000, Finn is roughed up by Bigg's thugs and left for dead. He hurries, once he escapes, to the divorce hearing his wife Tess has called in Key West, but he arrives one minute too late and the divorce goes through. Right after the proceeding, Finn shows her in a sketch the unique markings on the plate fragment he found.

Tess refuses to get sucked back into Finn's passion again, having decided to sell their boat to resume her graduate school studies she'd abandoned for him eight years ago. When he breaks it to her that it's sunk, she knocks him out.

Returning to The Precious Gem, the yacht where she has been working as a steward owned by multi-millionaire Nigel Honeycutt, Tess intends to save up enough money to return to Chicago. She's desperate to leave Key West, fearing Finn will find them.

Meanwhile, Finn has reconnected with Alfonz, who gives him intel on Nigel. His high-profile daughter Gemma is coming to his yacht by helicopter, so he takes a dinghy out, inadvertently saving her hat, injuring himself in the process. Taking Finn on board, the doctor who attends him recommends he stay for a few hours.

That evening, Tess is shocked that Finn is on the yacht. After dinner, she and Finn tell Nigel about the fabled Aurelia, with its 40 chests of riches, the Queen's Dowry. After spending two years in Seville's Archivo de Indias, they headed back to physically search for it in Florida. And finally the plate Finn just found is a clue to the location of the treasure. They persuade Nigel and Gemma to join them and fund the search.

Bigg Bunny and Finn's former mentor Moe Fitch are intent on finding the treasure first. The yacht and Moe's vessel compete to find it in The Bahamas. As Finn attempts to secretly take down Moe's search grid, he discovers a sword. Tess and Finn follow the clues to an ancient church and discover a diary describing its location. They are so excited by this discovery that they celebrate by having passionate sex.

A short time later, Bigg Bunny and his associates, who have been following them, take Tess hostage, assuming incorrectly that Finn is dead. Bigg Bunny forces her to aid him to seek the treasure in a blowhole. Tess finds it in the cave beneath, but is attacked by Cyrus, one of Bigg Bunny's associates.

Finn and the Honeycutts enlist Moe to help Tess and keep the treasure from Bigg Bunny. They arrive as Bigg Bunny sends his associate Curtis into the water to find out who was killed in the blowhole. Tess, Moe and Finn are able to overpower Curtis and get out of the blowhole, but Bigg Bunny kidnaps Tess again, this time on his plane. Moe then takes Curtis prisoner.

Gemma gets Finn to the seaplane on her jet ski, and he leaps onto the plane's pontoon as it takes flight. As Bigg Bunny attempts to shoot Finn, Tess kicks Bigg Bunny out of the plane, sending him into the ocean. Tess and Finn then have to land the plane. In the end, the treasure is displayed in Moe's museum, now renamed the Fitch-Finnegan Maritime Museum and Tess and Finn are back together, and she is shown to be pregnant.

Cast
 Matthew McConaughey as Finn
 Kate Hudson as Tess
 Donald Sutherland as Nigel Honeycutt
 Alexis Dziena as Gemma Honeycutt
 Ray Winstone as Moe Fitch
 Kevin Hart as Bigg Bunny
 Ewen Bremner as Alfonz
 Brian Hooks as Curtis
 Malcolm-Jamal Warner as Cordell
 Michael Mulheren as Eddie
 Adam LeFevre as Gary
 Rohan Nichol as Stefan
 David Roberts as Cyrus
 Roger Sciberras as Andras
 Dan Mewing as Pilot

Production

Warner Bros. and director Andy Tennant planned to shoot the film in the Caribbean, but decided on Queensland, Australia because the hurricane season in the Caribbean was likely to stall production of the film. The Key West scenes were filmed in Port Douglas. Filming also took place in Brisbane, the Gold Coast, Hamilton Island, Lizard Island, Airlie Beach, and Hervey Bay. Scenes were also filmed at Batt Reef, where Steve Irwin died from a stingray barb in 2006.

Inside scenes were shot on a sound stage at the Warner Bros studio facility and the actors and crew stayed in luxury homes and apartments on the Gold Coast. McConaughey mentioned having a python in the backyard of his house in Port Douglas. McConaughey said, "There were other days like the day we went out diving and swam with a dugong, which was very cool."

Two crew members were stung by Irukandji jellyfish during filming, so some of the water scenes were shot in the Caribbean because the actors were so frightened.

At the time of filming, The Precious Gem luxury motor yacht in the film was called the Keri Lee and has subsequently been renamed "Penny Mae". It was designed by yacht architect Ward Setzer of Setzer Design Group and originally named Status Quo.

2011 lawsuit
Warner Brothers Entertainment, Inc., was sued in 2011 by Canadian novelist Lou Boudreau, in Canadian court, alleging copyright infringement by Tennant and two other men over the authorship of the script. Warner Brothers did not comment on the matter.

Reception

Box office
Fool's Gold was released on February 8, 2008, in the North America and grossed $21.5 million in 3,125 theaters its opening weekend, ranking #1 at the box office. The film grossed over $110.5 million worldwide — $70.2 million in the North America and $40.3 million in other territories.

Critical response
  Audiences surveyed by CinemaScore gave the film an average grade of "B−" on an A+ to F scale.

Several critics compared the film unfavorably to National Treasure and Romancing the Stone. Some critics referred to the film as "tedious" and "listless." Peter Travers of Rolling Stone gave the film zero stars out of four and said "Paris Hilton's appalling The Hottie and the Nottie is "marginally better." Travers wrote "I defy any 2008 comedy to be as stupid, slack and sexless" as Fool's Gold. Lou Lumenick of the New York Post gave the film one star out of four and called it "excruciatingly lame". Lumenick said, "It's all basically an excuse to show off the scenery", including McConaughey's abs. Carrie Rickey of The Philadelphia Inquirer gave the film one and a half stars out of four and said it "plays like a Three Stooges movie with scuba gear", but that "a Three Stooges movie is enlightened next to this one." Rickey described McConaughey as "perennially shirtless" and Hudson as "peculiarly mirthless".

Pete Vonder Haar of Film Threat gave the film one and a half stars and said "the resolution is never in doubt, the villains are comedic rather than menacing, and no one involved seems to care one way or the other that their names are attached to this indifferent mess." Vonder Haar said McConaughey plays Finn "as Saharas Dirk Pitt minus the SEAL training and a few million brain cells." and asked "Does McConaughey have some codicil in his contract stipulating he must spend at least 51% of a movie shirtless?" Sid Smith of the Chicago Tribune gave it two stars out of four and said the characters "are comic book clichés". Smith said "the outcome is predictable" and "The wasted talents include Sutherland, affecting a hokey British accent, and hatchet-faced Ewen Bremner." Brian Lowry of Variety said, "The lure of Matthew McConaughey shirtless for extended stretches doubtless has some marketing value, but after that, Fool's Gold offers small compensation." Lowry wrote "At times the pic feels like a comedic version of The Deep, only without the comedy." Lowry said the tropic scenery was well-shot but said "there's not much chemistry" between McConaughey and Hudson.

Carina Chocano of the Los Angeles Times called it a "cheesy, familiar bore" and said it "feels at times like a third-rate Bond movie set to a Jimmy Buffett album." Chocano said "Hudson is the best thing about the movie. She has a likable, grounded presence and sharp comic timing." Nathan Rabin of The A.V. Club gave the film a "C+" and called it "the kind of thing people watch because it's the in-flight movie". Rabin called the repeated mentions of Finn's sexual prowess "a delightfully unnecessary move". Rabin said the film "outstays its welcome by a good 20 minutes" and called it "extravagantly stupid", but that the film's strengths were the "photogenic locales, obscenely beautiful stars, a laid-back soundtrack" and an unwillingness to take itself seriously. Lou Lumenick said the ending was "surprisingly bloody" and Brian Lowry said the ending is "a little more violent than necessary" and "a bit grittier than it should be tonally, as if we've detoured into a different movie." Simon Braund of Empire magazine gave the film one star out of five and called it "Absolute tosh. A ridiculous, unerringly tedious plot is weighed down by listless performances from a cast who clearly wished they were somewhere else, despite the sumptuous location."

The film earned a Razzie Award nomination for Kate Hudson as Worst Actress (also for My Best Friend's Girl).

Home media
Fool's Gold was released on DVD and Blu-ray discs on June 17, 2008. About 1,225,904 DVD units have been sold, acquiring revenue of $20,502,574. This does not include Blu-ray sales. It was presented in anamorphic widescreen with an English-language 5.1 digital surround soundtrack. The extras for the DVD include Flirting with Adventure McConaughey-Hudson chemistry featurette, and a gag reel. Fool's Gold was released on R4 Australian DVD on June 5, 2008.

References

External links
 
 
 
 
 
 

2008 films
2008 comedy films
2000s adventure films
American adventure comedy films
Treasure hunt films
Underwater action films
Films shot in Brisbane
Films shot at Village Roadshow Studios
Films directed by Andy Tennant
Films produced by Donald De Line
Films scored by George Fenton
Warner Bros. films
Animal Logic films
2000s English-language films
2000s American films